Club Deportivo Zarramonza is a Spanish football team based in Arróniz in the autonomous community of Navarre. Founded in 1966, it plays in Regional Preferente. Its stadium is Campo de Fútbol Santa Cruz with a capacity of 1,200 seaters.

Season to season

2 seasons in Tercera División

External links
Futbolme.com profile
navarrafutbolclic.com profile

Football clubs in Navarre
Association football clubs established in 1966
Divisiones Regionales de Fútbol clubs
1966 establishments in Spain